Sicyopterus griseus, the Clown goby, is a species of goby endemic to India and Sri Lanka, where it is found in estuaries, blackwaters, and fresh waters.  The populations within Sri Lanka is not yet internationally accepted, due to lack of evidences (Jayaram 1999). This species can reach a length of  SL.

References

 https://www.itis.gov/servlet/SingleRpt/SingleRpt?search_topic=TSN&search_value=638021
 http://indiabiodiversity.org/species/show/233536
 http://www.marinespecies.org/aphia.php?p=taxdetails&id=277431

Sicyopterus
Taxa named by Francis Day
Freshwater fish of India
Freshwater fish of Sri Lanka
Fish described in 1874